Damnation is a comic book limited series written by Donny Cates and Nick Spencer, illustrated by Rod Reis, and published in 2018 as four monthly issues by Marvel Comics. It was the main story in a crossover event with some plot elements occurring in tie-in issues of related ongoing series also published by Marvel.

Publication history
Damnation builds on events depicted in the 2017 crossover Secret Empire by Nick Spencer and various artists and the Doctor Strange ongoing series written by Donny Cates. The series was announced as a five-issue limited series on November 16, 2017, but later details reduced the count to four. The first issue was released February 21, 2018.

The crossover plot includes tie-in issues from some of Marvel's other contemporary ongoing series. These include Ben Reilly: Scarlet Spider #15–17, Doctor Strange #386–389, Iron Fist #78–80, and Johnny Blaze: Ghost Rider #1.

Damnation is Cates' last story with Doctor Strange. When the limited series concluded, he left the monthly title, later going on to write his run of Venom from 2018 to 2021.

Plot

Main plot
In the 2017 crossover event Secret Empire, Las Vegas was destroyed when HYDRA Helicarriers were dispatched to raze the city. After reclaiming his Sorcerer Supreme status from Loki, Doctor Strange uses his magic to restore it and resurrect the people who died. He is opposed by Mephisto, the ruler of Hell who has already claimed their souls as his own. He orchestrates events that causes his demons to bring Doctor Strange to his recently created Hotel Inferno. Mephisto claims that the remnants of Las Vegas were in his realm before it was restored. Hotel Inferno starts to have an effect on the people of Las Vegas. It also had an effect on Black Panther, Captain Marvel, Falcon, Hawkeye, and Jane Foster's Thor form where they were all turned into Ghost Rider-like creatures. The ghost of Doctor Strange's talking dog Bats sought out Wong so that he can help Doctor Strange. To help Doctor Strange, Wong summoned Blade, Doctor Voodoo, Moon Knight, Elsa Bloodstone, Ghost Rider, Iron Fist, Scarlet Spider, and Man-Thing to form the latest incarnation of the Midnight Sons.

Mephisto has turned Doctor Strange into a Ghost Rider-like creature. While Wong has assembled the Midnight Sons, they were overpowered by the demons roaming around Las Vegas. This attack got Wong and Bats' ghost separated from the rest. While the Midnight Sons were saved from the Ghost Riders by Scarlet Spider, Wong and Bats' ghost ran into Doctor Strange's Ghost Rider form.

Bats' ghost is able to possess the soulless body of Doctor Strange. While the Midnight Sons and Scarlet Spider fight the demons, Ghost Rider rides his motorcycle to the top of Hotel Inferno to confront Mephisto. After Mephisto removes the Ghost Rider from Johnny Blaze, he throws Blaze from the roof.

The Midnight Sons have been fighting the possessed Avengers for hours. Mephisto appeared on the battlefield and gloated on them sending Johnny Blaze to attack him. Just then, the possessed Avengers attack Mephisto as Wong revealed that Mephisto rendering his throne vacant has enabled Ghost Rider to become the new ruler of Mephisto's realm. After Doctor Strange returned from the Realm Between, he assisted the Midnight Sons and the Avengers into preventing Mephisto from returning to his realm to reclaim his throne. Though Doctor Strange defeated him, Mephisto fled back to his realm where he was defeated by Johnny Blaze and the different Ghost Riders from across the Multiverse. After Johnny Blaze sent Mephisto back to Earth, he was kept at the top of Hotel Inferno in countless restraints as Hotel Inferno remained on Earth. As Doctor Strange, the Avengers, and the Midnight Sons left upon Las Vegas returning to normal, Wong remained behind to keep an eye on Hotel Inferno's casino.

Tie-ins

Doctor Strange
As Hotel Inferno starts to affect the people of Las Vegas, Doctor Strange fought Mephisto in a game of blackjack. The deal is that Mephisto had to return the souls to Las Vegas if Doctor Strange won and that Doctor Strange's soul would be claimed if Mephisto won. Though Doctor Strange won by cheating, Mephisto found out and had Doctor Strange tortured. After being tortured, Doctor Strange is rescued by Scarlet Witch, Clea and Loki and jump into action when they see the Avengers fighting demons. It's later revealed that the rescue was all an illusion and that Clea was a possessed Captain Marvel who posed as her to trick Doctor Strange. While inside Doctor Strange's body, Bats' ghost and Doctor Strange's mind find themselves in the Realm Between where they find the souls of those that Mephisto has trapped while he controls their bodies. It is here where Doctor Strange finds the souls of the Avengers that Mephisto is controlling as well as Dormammu. With the souls of the Avengers, Doctor Strange's soul plans to find a way out of the Realm Between. Doctor Strange then manages to find a way to escape the Realm Between and helps the souls of the Avengers return to their bodies.

Ben Reilly: The Scarlet Spider
During the rise of Hotel Inferno, Ben Reilly sees the effect that the hotel has caused on the citizens of Las Vegas and springs into action. While fighting demons alongside the Midnight Sons, Scarlet Spider gets separated from the group and faces Mephisto, who tries to trick him into giving up his path to redemption. When Ben refuses, he sends a possessed Kaine Parker after him. After a long fight, Ben manages to free Kaine from his possession and convinces him to help defeat Mephisto.

Iron Fist
After being separated from the Midnight Sons, Iron Fist is found by Fat Cobra, who takes him to a fight tournament where the star fighter is Orson Randall, a former Iron Fist who died some time ago. After discovering what forces him to fight, Danny decides to help Orson escape by fighting in the tournament. During this time, the demon fight promoter brings in Danny's long-lost sister Miranda Rand-Kai, who is sent to fight Orson, as well as Fat Cobra's deceased mother. After fighting 12 monster demons, Danny and his friends are able to escape, though Orson dies during the fight. After sending Miranda, Fat Cobra and his mother to his place, Danny heads out to rejoin the Midnight Sons to defeat Mephisto.

Johnny Blaze: Ghost Rider
After Johnny was thrown off the roof, he passes away. This is all part of Wong's plan. In Hell, Johnny Blaze finds the now-independent Spirit of Vengeance and persuades him to help reach Mephisto's throne. The two of them combine together and make their way through the circles of Hell until they reach Mephisto's throne. After fighting through demons, Johnny manages to claim the throne and becomes the new King of Hell.

Reception
The series debuted to a mixed critical reception. The first issue received an average score of 6.9 out of 10 according to review aggregator Comic Book Roundup. Because the central premise is based on an event that occurred a year earlier, Comicbook.com found the plot immediately felt dated. Although Jesse Shedeen felt the issue was too much setup and too little story, he said it captured the charm of the Cates' monthly Doctor Strange series. His review for IGN concludes that the plot may have worked better if dealt with exclusively within Doctor Strange instead of in a crossover. Bleeding Cool was less impressed, calling it a "shocking misfire from the top-downwards" that makes the reader hate Doctor Strange. The second issue was received more favorably by Pierce Lydon, who called it "fairly delightful" in a review for Newsarama. David Brooke praised the artwork in his review for Adventures in Poor Taste.

Collected editions

References

2018 comics debuts
Doctor Strange titles